The following is a list of educational institutions in Coimbatore.

Schools

CBSE
Air Force School
Noyyal Public School
PSG Public Schools
Suguna PIP School
The NGP School
Yuvabharathi Public School
Delhi Public Schools, Coimbatore campus
Rathinam International Public School
 The Indian Public School
 Velammal Bodhi Campus
 Samashti International School

ICSE
Stanes Anglo Indian Higher Secondary School

Government Aided
CSI Boys Higher Secondary School
Stanes Anglo Indian Higher Secondary School
T.A.Ramalingam_Chettiar_Higher_Secondary_School

Private
Alvernia Matriculation Higher Secondary School
Carmel Garden Matriculation Higher Secondary School
GD Matriculation Higher Secondary School
GRG Matriculation Higher Secondary School
Islamiyah Matriculation Higher Secondary School
Lisieux Matriculation Higher Secondary School
Nirmala Matha Convent Matriculation Higher Secondary School
Perks Matriculation Higher Secondary School
PMG Matric Higher Secondary School
Sowdeshwari Vidyalaya
Sri Narayana Matric Higher Secondary School
St. Joseph's Matriculation Higher Secondary School
St Francis Anglo Indian Girls High School
St. Paul's Matric Higher Secondary School
S.B.O.A. Matric Higher Secondary School
Coimbatore Public School, Coimbatore

Colleges

Arts and Science
CBM College of Arts and Science
Dr.N.G.P.Arts and science college
Government Arts College
Hindusthan College of Arts and Science
KG College of Arts and Science
Nirmala College for Women
PSG College of Arts and Science
Sankara College of Science and Commerce
Shri Nehru Maha Vidyalaya College of Arts and Science
Sri Krishna Arts and Science College
Sri Ramakrishna College of Arts and Science for Women
Sri Ramakrishna Mission Vidyalaya College of Arts And Science
Sree Narayana Guru College
Rathinam College of Arts and Science

Engineering
Adithya Institute of Technology
Akshaya College of Engineering and Technology
Amrita School of Engineering
Arjun College Of Technology
Coimbatore Institute of Technology
Coimbatore Institute of Engineering and Technology
Dr.N.G.P.Institute of technology
Government College of Technology
Hindusthan Institute of Technology
Indus College of Engineering Coimbatore
Info Institute of Engineering
JCT College of Engineering and Technology
Kathir College of Engineering
Kalaignar Karunanidhi Institute of Technology
Kalaivani College of Technology
Karpagam College of Engineering
Karpagam Institute of Technology, Coimbatore
Kathir College of Engineering
KGiSL Institute of Technology
KPR Institute of Engineering and Technology
KTVR Knowledge Park for Engineering and Technology
Kumaraguru College of Technology
Maharaja Institute of Technology
Park College of Engineering and Technology
PPG Institute of Technology
PSG College of Technology
PSG Institute of Technology and Applied Research
SNS College of Engineering
SNS College of Technology
Sri Krishna College of Engineering & Technology
Sri Eshwar College of Engineering
Sri Ramakrishna Institute of Technology 
Sri Shakthi Institute of Engineering and Technology
Sri Ramakrishna Engineering College
Tamil Nadu College of Engineering
VSB College Of Engineering and Technical Campus

Law
Government Law College

Management
Amrita School of Business
DJ Academy of Managerial Excellence
KV Institute of Management and Information Studies
PSG Institute of Management

Military
Air Force Administrative College

Medicine
Coimbatore Medical College
PSG Institute of Medical Sciences & Research
Government Medical College & ESIC hospital, formally ESIC medical college
 KMCH Medical College
 GKNMH Medical Research Institute [Upcoming]

Agriculture
 Agricultural Engineering College and Research Institute

Media
 Clusters Institute Of media and Technology

Universities
Amrita Vishwa Vidyapeetham
Anna University
Avinashilingam University
Bharathiar University
Karpagam University
Karunya Institute of Technology and Sciences
Tamil Nadu Agricultural University

Research Institutions
Central Institute for Cotton Research
Indian Council of Forestry Research and Education
Institute of Forest Genetics and Tree Breeding
Sálim Ali Centre for Ornithology and Natural History
South India Textile Research
Sardar Vallabhbhai Patel International School of Textiles & Management
Sugarcane Breeding Research Institute

References

 
Coimbatore